The Rehabilitation and Research Centre for Torture Victims (RCT) is a self-governing institution independent of party politics located in Denmark.  The institution works to expose and document torture on a health professional basis, develop clinical diagnoses and treatment methods of torture survivors, educate in order to contribute to the global effort to abolish torture.

To achieve these this, RCT runs a centre that undertakes clinical research and method development to provide knowledge on torture and the form and extent of the after-effects as well as treat and rehabilitate those have been subjected to torture.  RCT also promotes knowledge of the reasons for torture, conventions and laws, treatment methods and prevention of torture as well as carrying out project work aimed at treating and rehabilitating torture survivors and preventing torture.

RCT changes its name to DIGNITY - Danish Institute against Torture 
On 30 October 2012 RCT changed its name to DIGNITY - Danish Institute against Torture.

External links
 Official site
 Rehabilitation and Research Centre for Torture Victims: Field Manual on Rehabilitation (2007)

Torture victim support organizations
Human rights organizations based in Denmark